Half-Life is a series of first-person shooter games developed and published by Valve, beginning with the original Half-Life, released for Windows in 1998. The earliest known canceled Half-Life game dates to 1999. Between Half-Life 2: Episode Two (2007) and Half-Life: Alyx (2020), Valve canceled at least five Half-Life games, including Half-Life 2: Episode Three, a version of Half-Life 3, and games by 2015, Inc., Junction Point Studios and Arkane Studios.

Half-Life era (1998–2004)

Half-Life: Hostile Takeover 
On November 23, 1999, GameSpot reported that 2015, Inc. was developing a Half-Life expansion pack to follow Half-Life: Opposing Force. 2015, Inc declined to comment. On March 18, 2000, the Adrenaline Vault reported that the new expansion was named Half-Life: Hostile Takeover, and that it had appeared on retail product lists with a release date of late August. On August 7, the Adrenaline Vault reported that Sierra, the Half-Life publisher, had informed them that Hostile Takeover had been canceled. The stock keeping unit for Hostile Takeover was repurposed by online retailers for Half-Life: Counter-Strike. On June 21, 2001, Valve filed a video game trademark for "Hostile Takeover". After several extensions, the trademark expired on October 3, 2004.

Dreamcast port 
On February 14, 2000, Sierra announced that a port of Half-Life for the Dreamcast console was in development by Captivation Digital Laboratories with Valve and Gearbox Software. The Dreamcast port would feature improvements including higher-polygon characters and new lighting effects. Gearbox, who had developed Opposing Force, created a new single-player campaign for the Dreamcast port, Half-Life: Blue Shift, focusing on the security guard Barney. 

The port was delayed to September 2000, then November, when game publications began to receive early copies for review. Reception was mixed, with criticism for the inconsistent frame rate, long loading times, and lack of online play. Recognizing the demand for online play, Sierra planned to release a version with online multiplayer using SegaNet. The Gearbox CEO, Randy Pitchford, said he suggested including additional multiplayer modes and mods from the Windows version, including Team Fortress Classic and the multiplayer modes from Opposing Force. Sierra delayed the port again to ensure that it met the "high expectations of consumers", and said that they hoped to finish development by the end of the year.

On March 29, 2001, Sierra announced that Blue Shift would be released for Windows along with the new models developed for the Dreamcast version, as part of the Half-Life High Definition Pack. On June 16, 2001, four days after the release of Blue Shift, Sierra announced that it had canceled the Dreamcast port, citing "changing market conditions". It was weeks away from its release date and virtually complete. In 2013, a late version of the Dreamcast port leaked online, featuring complete versions of Half-Life and Blue Shift.

Mac port 
Valve canceled a version of Half-Life for Mac OS X, developed by Logicware, in 2000. The Valve CEO, Gabe Newell, said the port was substandard, citing a separate multiplayer network, no automatic update utility and the inability to include Valve's multiplayer mod Team Fortress Classic. He said he did not want to make Mac players "second-class customers" and preferred to write off the investment rather than "take money from Mac customers and shortchange them". Rebecca Heineman, the co-founder of Logicware, denied this, saying that Valve cancelled the port as Apple had angered them by misrepresenting sales projections. She said the port was complete and three weeks from release. Valve released their own Mac port in 2013.

Half-Life 2 era (2004–2007)

Half-Life 2: Episode Three 

In May 2006, Valve announced a trilogy of episodic games that would continue the story of Half-Life 2 (2004). Episode One was released on June 1, 2006, followed by Episode Two on October 10, 2007. Episode Three was initially planned for Christmas 2007. Valve released little information about it in the following years, and in 2011 Wired described it as vaporware.

Valve eventually abandoned episodic development, as they wanted to create more ambitious games. The designer Robin Walker said Valve failed to find a unifying idea for the game that provided a sense of "wonderment, or opening, or expansion". Additionally, they had started developing a new game engine, Source 2; as developing Half-Life 2 and the original Source engine simultaneously had created problems, Valve delayed development of a new Half-Life until Source 2 was complete.

In 2016, Marc Laidlaw, the writer of the Half-Life series, left Valve. In 2017, he posted a short story, "Epistle 3", on his website. Journalists interpreted it as a synopsis of the plot for Episode Three; alternatively, it may have been intended for Borealis, another canceled project. Walker denied that it had been Valve's plan for Episode Three, and said that it was likely just one of many ideas by Laidlaw. After Laidlaw published the story, some players left negative reviews for Dota 2 on Steam, believing that Valve had forgone the Half-Life series. The story led to fan efforts to create Episode Three.

Junction Point Studios episode 

Another Half-Life 2 episode was developed by Junction Point Studios, led by Warren Spector. The episode showed how Ravenholm became the town seen in Half-Life 2, infested with headcrabs and zombies, and saw the return of the character of Father Grigori. It included a "magnet gun", which fired projectiles that magnetized metal surfaces and attracted objects and enemies, and would have been used for combat and puzzles. 

Junction Point worked on the game for a year, producing enough content to demonstrate one section, and a vertical slice that demonstrated the magnet gun. Valve lost interest in the project and Junction Point, who had been acquired by Disney Interactive Studios partway through, canceled it to instead develop Epic Mickey. Images of the game appeared in early 2017.

Ravenholm 
In 2007 or 2008, Valve gave the Junction Point project to Arkane Studios in Lyon, France. They developed it into a standalone game with the working title Ravenholm. Players controlled Adrian Shephard from Opposing Force, working alongside Father Grigori, who had taken refuge in an abandoned psychiatric hospital. Grigori was experimenting with the effects of headcrab venom on himself, and would mutate through the story. The player would use the magnet gun and traps created by Grigori against enemies. Arkane also implemented a nailgun that could create paths to conduct electricity and set traps. 

Valve gave Arkane freedom to develop Ravenholm, as they had with Gearbox and Opposing Force, providing feedback and technical support. With approximately one year left of development, Valve canceled the project; the Arkane founder, Raphaël Colantonio, believed that Valve decided it would be too expensive, and Laidlaw said that Valve felt the premise was creatively constrained. Ravenholm was first shown publicly in a 2020 Noclip documentary. Noclip released an hour of gameplay footage in 2022.

Source 2 era (2007–2020)

Half-Life 3 
Half-Life 3 was in development between 2013 and 2014. Valve planned to use procedurally generated levels alongside a "crafted experience", similar to the Left 4 Dead series; for example, the game would generate different routes through environments each time it was played. The team took new scans of the face of Frank Sheldon, whose likeness was used for the G-Man character in Half-Life 2. The Source 2 engine was still unfinished and the project was canceled early in development.

Borealis 
Before his departure from Valve in 2016, Laidlaw led a virtual reality project on the Source 2 engine, Borealis, set on the time-travelling ship mentioned in Episode Two and Portal 2. The game would skip between the time of the Seven Hour War, the period in which the Combine conquered Earth before Half-Life 2, and a time set shortly after Episode Two. A minigame in which players would fish off the bow of the ship was also proposed. Borealis may have inspired Laidlaw's "Epistle 3" story. Laidlaw said the project ended because it was too early to be working in VR: "When people are struggling with the basic tools they need to rough out a concept, it’s hard to convey any sort of vision, and it all evaporated pretty quickly."

References 

Windows games
Half-Life (series)
Cancelled video games
Valve Corporation games